The 1996 ITC Nürburgring-1 round was the second round of the 1996 International Touring Car Championship season. It took place on 12 May at the Nürburgring.

Jörg van Ommen won the first race, starting from pole position, driving a Mercedes C-Class, and Manuel Reuter gained the second one, driving an Opel Calibra V6 4x4.

Classification

Qualifying

Notes:
 – Alessandro Nannini and Giancarlo Fisichella were excluded from the event for using illegal fuel.

Race 1

Race 2

Notes:
 – Alexander Wurz was disqualified because his team worked on the car during a stop-and-go penalty given for causing an accident with Oliver Gavin.

Standings after the event

Drivers' Championship standings

Manufacturers' Championship standings

 Note: Only the top five positions are included for both sets of drivers' standings.

References

External links
Deutsche Tourenwagen Masters official website

1996 International Touring Car Championship season
Sport in Rhineland-Palatinate